TEACHED is a series of short films created by Kelly Amis and produced by her company, Loudspeaker Films. TEACHED candidly examines the experiences of youth of color in America, especially African American boys. The TEACHED films have won seventeen international film festival awards and screened at venues including the U.S. Department of Education, SXSW-Edu, Museum of the Moving Image, the Salesforce Foundation, LinkedIn and a wide variety of universities, businesses, faith-based institutions and non-profit organizations. Their short film format is particularly conducive to interactive screening events and bringing diverse audiences together to discuss complex issues. The most recent TEACHED film, Think of Calvin, premiered at The Atlantic's Inaugural Race & Justice Summit, followed by a panel discussion hosted by NPR's Michele Norris (broadcast on C-Span) and a dialogue with the Washington, DC Police Chief. 
.

Synopsis
Demeaned, suspended, expelled ..."teached."  Why are so many students, especially African American boys, not achieving their potential? Why do we still have a race-based "achievement gap" in the U.S.? The TEACHED series reflects creator Kelly Amis' experience as a teacher, education researcher, and policy strategist. The series addresses some of today's most challenging education issues, from the under-education and over-incarceration of minority youth to the structures within the teaching profession that virtually guarantee that certain demographic groups will never have the same opportunities to succeed as their peers.

Episodes

Cast and crew
 Kelly Amis - Producer, Director & Editor
 Sergei Krasikov - Cinematographer, Editor
 Art Meyerhoff - Cinematographer
 Shaka Jamal - Cinematographer, Editor
 Vincent Cortez - Cinematographer
 Natacha Giler - Cinematographer
 Kate Stilley Steiner - Editor
 Sean Kimber - Graphics 
 Asparagus Studios - Music
 Michael Harris - Music
 Kev Choice - Music
 Gwendolyn Barriac - Music
 Phillip Ebeid - Cinematographer
 Christina Voros - Cinematographer
 Ana-Lena Isaksson - Cinematographer
 Justin Ammon - Cinematographer
 Andrew Blum - Cinematographer
 Cyrus Dowlatshahi - Cinematographer
 Ri Crawford - Title Sequence

Production
TEACHED is the signature project of Loudspeaker Films, an independent media company founded by Kelly Amis in 2010. It was originally conceived as a feature-length documentary but evolved into a short film series during production. The TEACHED series was sponsored by the International Documentary Association and funded by charitable contributions. In 2013, Amis won the Teach for America Social Innovation Award, which provided an additional $50,000 to the project. The TEACHED series is complemented by an online interview series, On the Loudspeaker, which features national figures such as John Legend, Van Jones, Wendy Kopp and Deray McKesson discussing the issues examined in the films.

Awards and screenings
THINK OF CALVIN
WINNER- Best Short Documentary, Napa Valley Film Festival 
WINNER- Best Documentary, Uptown Short Film Festival
Official Selection- Vail Film Festival
Official Selection- Oakland International Film Festival
Official Selection- Indianapolis Black Expo Film Festival
Official Selection- Dingle International Film Festival
Official Selection- Williamsburg Film Festival
Featured at The Atlantic's Race & Justice Summit

CODE OAKLAND
WINNER - Best Short Documentary, Harlem International Film Festival
WINNER - Best Documentary, Humboldt Film Festival
WINNER - Best Film, Fulbright Association Film Festival
WINNER - Award of Merit, Los Angeles Independent Film Festival
WINNER - Aloha Award, Honolulu Film Festival
WINNER - Audience Award, (In)Justice for All Film Festival
WINNER - Social Impact Award, (In)Justice for All Film Festival
WINNER - Bronze, Social & Economic Issues, Houston World Fest
WINNER - Honorable Mention, Napa Valley Film Festival
WINNER - Rising Star Award for Director Kelly Amis, Canada Film Festival
Official Selection - St. Louis International Film Festival 
Official Selection - Sacramento Film Festival 
Official Selection - San Francisco Black Film Festival
Official Selection - Milan International Film Fest
Official Selection - Heartland International Film Fest
Official Selection - Breckenridge Film Festival
Official Selection - Joshua Tree Film Festival
Official Selection - Boise Film Festival
Official Selection - Manchester International Film Festival
Official Selection - Little Rock Film Festival
Official Selection - Julien Dubuque International Film Festival
Official Selection - Madrid International Film Festival

TEACHED VOL. I (THE PATH TO PRISON, UNCHARTERED TERRITORY, and THE BLAME GAME)
WINNER - Best Short Documentary,  Williamsburg Film Festival
WINNER - Spirit of Independence Jury Prize: Amsterdam Film Festival
Official Selection - SXSWedu
Official Selection - Colorado Film Festival
Official Selection - Napa Valley Film Festival
Official Selection - Harlem International Film Festival
Official Selection - SouthSide Film Festival
Official Selection - deadCenter Film Festival
Official Selection - Sonoma International Film Festival
Official Selection - Miami Short Film Festival
Official Selection - London Lift-Off Film Festival
Official Selection - Taos Shorts Film Festival
Official Selection - New Hampshire Film Festival
Official Selection - Big Easy International Film Festival
Official Selection - Albany Film Festival
Official Selection - Los Angeles Independent Film Festival

References

External links
 Official movie website
8 
 
 
 

2011 films
2011 documentary films
American documentary films
Documentary films about education in the United States
2010s English-language films
2010s American films